Kobylnice is a village and municipality in Svidník District in the Prešov Region of north-eastern Slovakia.

History 
In historical records the village was first mentioned in 1363. Kobylnice is the (somewhat disputed) birthplace of Saint Alexis Toth (1854–1909).

Geography 
The municipality lies at an altitude of 230 metres and covers an area of 10.425 km². It has a population of about 104 people.

Genealogical resources
The records for genealogical research are available at the state archive "Statny Archiv in Presov, Slovakia"

 Roman Catholic church records (births/marriages/deaths): 1776–1897 (parish B)
 Greek Catholic church records (births/marriages/deaths): 1862–1933 (parish A)

See also
 List of municipalities and towns in Slovakia

References

External links 
 
Surnames of living people in Kobylnice

Villages and municipalities in Svidník District
Šariš